KLFC may refer to:

 King's Lynn F.C., an English football club
 Kings Langley F.C., an English football club
 KLFC (FM), a radio station (88.1 FM) licensed to Branson, Missouri, United States